Palaemonetes kadiakensis, the Mississippi grass shrimp, is a species of freshwater shrimp from the Central United States, specifically the Mississippi River Basin

Early Development 
The eggs of Palaemonetes kadiakensis are 1.4 mm. long or about one twenty-fifth of the adult length.  In laboratory settings the incubation period of Palaemonetes kadiakensis eggs has been observed to be 24–28 days.

After hatching a Palaemonetes kadiakensis will go through six distinct larval stages before reaching its final adult form.  Among larvae reared in experiments, the duration of larval life was 16 to 24 days and the average length of larval life was 19.64 days.  In laboratory settings the larvae are fed Artemia salina Nauplius or 100-500 micron sized commercial feed.

References 

Palaemonidae
Crustaceans described in 1902